Mulewal Khehra (Brahmna) is a village in Shahkot in Jalandhar district of Punjab State, India. The village is administrated by a sarpanch who is an elected representative of village as per Panchayati raj (India).

Transport 
Shahkot Malisian station is the nearest train station.

References 

 2. Facebook page= https://www.facebook.com/PindMulewalkhehra/

Public figures 

 Sohan singh 
 Ranjit Singh Saraan

Villages in Jalandhar district